Scaphidomorphus is a genus of beetles belonging to the family Erotylidae.

The species of this genus are found in Southern America.

Species:

Scaphidomorphus bosci 
Scaphidomorphus quinquepunctatus

References

Erotylidae